Charles Lloyd may refer to:

Military
 Charles Lloyd (Australian general) (1899–1956), Australian Army general
 Charles Lloyd (South Africa) (died 2014), South African army general

Music
 Charles Lloyd (jazz musician) (born 1938), American jazz saxophonist
 Charles Harford Lloyd (1849–1919), English composer and organist
 Charles Lloyd (organ builder) (1835–1908), pipe organ builder based in Nottingham
 C. F. Lloyd (Charles Francis Lloyd, fl. 1909–1928), his son, organ builder

Politics
 Sir Charles Lloyd, 1st Baronet, of Garth (died c. 1678), MP for Montgomeryshire
 Sir Charles Lloyd, 1st Baronet, of Milfield (1662–1723), MP for Cardigan boroughs, 1698–1701
 Charles Lloyd (Labour politician) (1879–1939), Member of Parliament for Llandaff and Barry, 1929–1931

Religion
 Charles Lloyd (minister) (1766–1829), Welsh dissenter and schoolmaster
 Charles Lloyd (bishop) (1784–1829), bishop of Oxford
 Charles Lloyd (priest) (1879–?), Dean of Argyll and The Isles

Other
 Brian Lloyd (rower) (Charles Brian Murray Lloyd, 1927–1995), British Olympic rower
 Charles Lloyd (philanthropist) (1748–1828), English banker 
 Charles Lloyd (poet) (1775–1839), son of the banker
 Charles W. Lloyd (1915–1999), educationalist
 Charles Cornwallis Lloyd (c. 1700–1729), British aristocrat
 Charles Lloyd (cricketer) (1789–1876), English cricketer
 Charles Mostyn Lloyd (1878–1946), British academic, magazine editor, and socialist activist
 Charles Lloyd, pen name of Charles Birkin (1907–1985), English author